Francisco Javier Martínez Cedena (born 13 March 1954 in Madrid) is a former Spanish cyclist.

Palmarès

1972
1st  Junior National Road Race Champion
1975
1st stages 2 and 5 Cinturón a Mallorca
1976
1st stage 4 Cinturón a Mallorca
1979
1st Trofeo Elola
3rd Vuelta a Aragón
1st stage 3
1980
1st stage 2 Vuelta a La Rioja
1981
Vuelta a España
1st  Points classification
1st stage 19
1st stage 5 Vuelta a Cantabria
1982
1st stage 6b Vuelta a Asturias
1983
1st Vuelta a Murcia

References

1954 births
Living people
Cyclists from Madrid
Spanish male cyclists
Spanish Vuelta a España stage winners